Black Day (Korean: 블랙데이) is an unofficial holiday observed on April 14 each year. It is mostly observed in South Korea by singles.

The day is associated with Valentine's Day and White Day as a holiday on the 14th day of the month. On this day, people who did not receive gifts on the previous two days gather and eat jajangmyeon, noodles with black sauce. This day is specifically for single people.

Origins
In South Korea, Valentine's Day and White Day are both celebrated as occasions to give gifts to significant others. Valentine's Day is celebrated on February 14, when women buy men gifts (usually chocolate). Black Day originally did not exist until after Valentines Day and White Day became popular. Uniquely, Japan and South Korea are the only countries that celebrate Valentine's Day twice. Because of all the love holidays (14 to be exact) that occur in Korea, many felt that single people also deserved recognition. White Day is celebrated on March 14, when men reciprocate the gifts with their own, also present in the form of chocolate. As both occasions fall on the 14th, other holidays were created by the government of South Korea for all other months to continue this trend. The creation has also been attributed to marketers.

Meaning
Black Day builds on the romantic aspect of Valentine's Day and White Day. As the chocolates received on Valentine's Day are interpreted to symbolize a man's popularity and the chocolates given on White Day are used solely for romantic purposes, Black Day focuses on the people, especially singles, who did not receive any gifts on either of the holidays.

On the day, singles who have not received presents on both days gather wearing black to 'commiserate' over black-colored food, especially jajangmyeon. During the meal, they complain about their lack of intimate relationships and chocolate gifts.

Celebration 
Many people take Black Day as an opportunity to celebrate with friends and family. The term celebrating is used loosely. Some people celebrate Black Day with their friends to embrace the fact that they are single, since there is less societal pressure to be in a relationship in Korea today. Other people who celebrate Black Day indulge in comfort food.

The most commonly eaten food on Black Day is jjajangmyeon, a popular black bean noodle dish in Korea. People eat jjajangmyeon on Black Day because it is a simple, yet delicious dish that one can get at a cheap price. The people who celebrate eat at Chinese-styled restaurants. Though not black, danmuji, tangsuyuk, and kimchi are popular side dishes that are enjoyed with jjajangmyeon. Those who want to celebrate by themselves order take-out from these restaurants.

People who use this as an opportunity to promote music, food, clothes, competitions, and matchmaking services. Many restaurants and companies use Black Day to promote discounts on their items. Restaurants expect their sales to be double, or even triple, the amount they usually make. Black coffee and jjajangmyeon are two popular food options that sell out very quick on this day.

Impact
This day is targeted by businesses, who hold various events and advertise their products, a strategy known as 'day marketing. The events are highly popular, and include matchmaking events such as speed dating, jajangmyeon-eating contests, and discounts on items.

Other countries 
Like Korea, other countries have their own version of Black Day. They use this as an opportunity to celebrate the joys of being single. The United States of America celebrates Single Awareness Day on the 15th of February, the day after Valentine's Day. Unlike Korea, the United States does not promote Single Awareness Day.

China celebrates single day on November 11th. It is celebrated on the 11th of November because the ones represent single sticks. Like Korea, China promotes many discounts for singles. Single's Day in China continues to be China's biggest e-commerce sale. Alibaba registered $38.4 billion worth of sales on Single's Day alone.

See also 

Singles Awareness Day
Singles Day

References

Unofficial observances
South Korean popular culture
April observances

de:Black Day